Father Julian Astromov, SJ (1820–1913) was a Russian Catholic priest.

Born into a noble family of Orthodox religion. He graduated from the law faculty of Saint Petersburg University, where he showed interest in Catholicism. From 1845 he served in the Department of confessions. In 1846 while on vacation in Rome, Astromov joined to Catholic Church and joined the Society of Jesus. He studied philosophy in France. In 1856 he was ordained a priest and began to teach in the various Jesuit schools, and later served as chaplain of the Polish Church of Saint Stanislaus in Rome.  He was author of a number of apologetic works on Russian language. Father Julian Astromov died in 1913.

Works

 De l'Infaillibilité, impr. de C. Voghera, 1882. 
 Introductio ad intelligendam doctrinam Angelici Doctoris, ex typis hospitii S. Michaelis, 1884. 
 Du Pouvoir temporel, impr. de l'hospice Saint-Michel, 1885.

References

External links
 https://web.archive.org/web/20120425083012/http://www.alymov-spb.ru/rus_kat_ch_1_2.html
 http://www.russinitalia.it/2013/dettaglio.php?id=528

Converts to Roman Catholicism
Converts to Roman Catholicism from Eastern Orthodoxy
Former Russian Orthodox Christians
Roman Catholics from the Russian Empire
1820 births
Jesuits from the Russian Empire
1913 deaths